{{Infobox comics creator|name=R. A. Kosasih|birth_name=Raden Ahmad Kosasih|birth_place=Bogor, West Java, |birth_date=|nationality=|death_date=|death_place=Tangerang, Banten, |write=Y|art=Y|ink=Y|pencil=Y|letter=Y|notable works=    Mahabarata  Ramayana}}
Raden Ahmad Kosasih (April 4, 1919-July 24, 2012) was an Indonesian comics author.

 Biography 
Raden Kosasih was born in Bogor, Indonesia, at April 4, 1919. At the start of his career, he worked as a book illustrator.

Kosasih published his first comics, a five-part comic book series featuring the female superheroes Sri Asih and Siti Gahara, in 1954. It was the first popular indigenous comic book in Indonesia.

Kosasih started from the wayang (Indonesian puppet theatre) stories, traditions and techniques and applied these to comics. His major works were his adaptations of the ancient Indian epics Mahabharata between 1957 and 1959 (the main series in 37 volumes, and many other comics about characters from the epic) and the Ramayana. Other comics by Kosasih include Wayang Purwa and Sri Kresna (four volumes, 1983). His Mahabharata diverged from the typical wayang Indonesian elements in the stories and turned back to the original Indian versions. Its popularity lead to a renewed interest in the wayang versions as well, and many wayang puppeteers incorporated elements from the comics into their stories.

Kosasih continued to write and draw comics until 1993, when Parkinson's disease made it impossible to continue. At the time of his death in 2012 he lived in Ciputat.

Partial bibliographySri AsihCempakaSeri MahabharataRamayanaLahirnya RahwanaWayang PurwaPrabu UdrayanaArjuna SasrabahuPanji SemirangSangkuriangParikesitLutung KasarungRara IntenLeluhur HastinaBharata YudhaPandhawa SedaSetan CebolDadali PutihSiti GaharaKala HitamKujang Emas''

Notes

1919 births
2012 deaths
Indonesian comics artists
People from Bogor